Kelp tea is a traditional East Asian tea made by infusing kelp in hot water. It is called kobu-cha or konbu-cha in Japan, haidai-cha in China and dasima-cha in Korea.

Preparation

Korea 
Either dried kelp powder or julienned kelp can be used to make the tea.

Powdered tea can be made by pan-frying and pounding cleaned and dried kelp. For a cup of hot water, two to three spoons of kelp powder is used. Optionally, sugar or honey can be added.

The kelp slices are removed after infusing, and salt is added to taste.

References 

Herbal tea
Japanese tea
Chinese tea
Korean tea